Aschersleben-Staßfurt was a district in Saxony-Anhalt, Germany until 2007. It was bounded by (from the northeast and clockwise) the districts of Schönebeck, Bernburg, Mansfelder Land, Quedlinburg and Bördekreis.

History 

The two districts of Aschersleben and Staßfurt were merged in 1994 in order to form the new district of Aschersleben-Staßfurt. As part of the reform of 2007 the district was disbanded and the area is now part of the Salzlandkreis district except Falkenstein which now is part of the Harz district.

Geography 

The southwestern parts of the district are occupied by the foothills of the Harz Mountains. From here the country slopes away to the Saale valley in the east and the Elbe valley in the northeast. Both rivers don't cross the district itself. The two main watercourses are the Bode and the Wipper, both affluents of the Saale.

Apart from the Harz foothills the region is mainly agriculturally used.

Coat of arms

Towns and municipalities

See also
 Abraum salts, salt deposit (geological feature)

External links
Official website (German)
Unofficial website (German)

1994 establishments in Germany
2007 disestablishments in Germany